Jagdish Singh is an Indian boxer and a boxing coach from Bhiwani district of the Indian state of Haryana. He founded the Bhiwani Boxing Club (BBC) in 2003, which produced four members of the five member boxing team in Beijing Olympics 2008, including the bronze medal winner, Vijender Singh. His five students received Arjun Award. Such as Akhil Kumar 2005, Vijender Singh 2006, Dinesh Kumar 2010, Vikas Krishan Yadav 2012, Kavita Chahal 2013.

The credit for turning Bhiwani into an elite boxing center largely goes to an intrepid Sports Authority of India coach Jagdish Singh, who has been at the center since 1996. He was awarded India's highest honour for sports coaching, the 2007 Dronacharya Award.
His 12 students won medals in world championships including 5 gold, 1 silver, and 6 bronze medals in various age groups.

Career
A former national boxer, Jagdish has produced boxers like a factory, in a country of cricket crazy people. He is known for his unconventional training methods. Due to his no-compromise attitude, politics in committee kept him away from Beijing and from his quartet (Akhil, Jeetendar, Dinesh and Vijender). More than 1000 have graduated from his academy and have won nearly 259 medals at international arena and 410 national medals ranging in different competitions from world championship to Olympics. Currently there are 135 odd being trained. Boxers are encouraged to fight without chin guards, thus making them tough and skillful. Mittal Champions trust is also funding the boxers at his center for sometime now.

In 2003, Singh established the 'Bhiwani Boxing Club' withdrawing his provident fund, mortgaging his home and land to obtain loan of 4 lakhs from Gramin bank. BBC has a 25-metre track, a multi-utility gym, three punching bags and a mobile boxing ring.

In the 2004 Athens Olympics, three out of the four qualifiers were from Bhiwani. Due to its record of producing competent boxers, Bhiwani is now being called the 'Cuba of India', with more than 10 per cent of the children in the district trying their hand at boxing. Singh received the 2007 Dronacharya Award (highest award conferred on coaches in India) from the Government of India on 29 August 2008. He had threatened not to accept this if none of his quartet went on to win a medal at the Beijing Olympics.

Olympics 2008
Out of the five Indian boxers in 2008 Beijing Olympics, four have come out of his BBC academy. His wards include the three Indian boxers who have qualified for the quarterfinals at Beijing, viz., Akhil Kumar, Jitender Kumar and lastly Vijender Singh, who eventually won a bronze medal at Beijing Olympics, India's first Boxing medal in the Olympic Games.

References 

Boxers from Haryana
Living people
Indian boxing coaches
Indian male boxers
People from Bhiwani
Recipients of the Dronacharya Award
Year of birth missing (living people)